Nabarlek are an Indigenous Roots band from Manmoyi, a tiny community in Arnhem Land, 215 kilometres from the remote community of Gunbalanya. The band formed in 1985 as a group of singers and dancers with a couple of busted guitars and flour tins for drums. The members are Bininj (the indigenous people of West Arnhem Land) and they sing in the Kunwinjku language and in English, trying to reach across the cultures. Their songs are traditional songs of the Kunwinjku people of western Arnhem Land with a rock/reggae arrangement. They call themselves the garage band that never had a garage.

They have performed with the Darwin Symphony Orchestra and Yothu Yindi, supported Midnight Oil and played with Silverchair and Powderfinger on their Across the Great Divide national tour. They played at many music festivals, including several Darwin Festivals, the Adelaide Festival in 2000, and Womadelaide, the Port Fairy and Brunswick Music Festivals in 2001. They played for six
weeks at the International World Expo in Hanover, Germany in 2000.

Their album Bininj Manborlh was nominated for the 2002 ARIA Award for Best World Music Album. They also received a nominations for Deadlys in 2001, 2002 and 2007.
They are the subject of From outstation to out there. Nabarlek a music industry case study a DVD created by Gillian Harrison.

Discography

Awards and nominations

ARIA Music Awards
The ARIA Music Awards is an annual awards ceremony that recognises excellence, innovation, and achievement across all genres of Australian music. They commenced in 1987.

! 
|-
| 2002
| Bininj Manborlh / Blackfella Road
| ARIA Award for Best World Music Album
| 
| 
|-

National Indigenous Music Awards
The National Indigenous Music Awards recognise excellence, innovation and leadership among Aboriginal and Torres Strait Islander musicians from throughout Australia. It commenced in 2004.

|-
| 2004
| Nabarlek
| Excellence in Music Industry Training
| 
|-
| 2005
| Nabarlek
| Band of the Year
| 
|-
| 2006
| Nabarlek - Nabarlek on Tour
| Best DVD Release
| 
|-
| rowspan="4"| 2007
| rowspan="2"| Nabarlek - Manmoyi Radio
| Album of the Year
| 
|-
| Artwork & Design of the Year
| 
|-
| Nabarlek - "Bushfire"
| People's Choice - "Song for Country"
| 
|-
| DVD/Film Clip of the Year
| Nabarlek - "Brownbird"
| 
|}

References

Northern Territory musical groups
Indigenous Australian musical groups
Musical groups established in 1985
1985 establishments in Australia